Harpalus saxicola is a species of ground beetle native to the Palearctic realm and Near East. In Europe, it can be found in such countries as Albania, Austria, Bulgaria, Greece, Hungary, Moldova, Romania, Slovakia, Slovenia, Sweden, Ukraine, all states of former Yugoslavia (except for Croatia and Slovenia), and southern part of Russia. It is also found in Armenia, Cyprus, Georgia, Iran, Israel, Syria and Turkey.

References

External links
Harpalus saxicola on Carabidae of Romania

saxicola
Beetles of Asia
Beetles of Europe
Beetles described in 1829